Wanted at Headquarters is a 1920 American silent drama film directed by Stuart Paton and written by Wallace C. Clifton. The film stars Eva Novak, Agnes Emerson, Lee Shumway, William Marlon, Lloyd Sedgwick, and Howard Davies. The film was released on October 25, 1920, by Universal Film Manufacturing Company. It is based on the 1918 novel Kate Plus Ten by Edgar Wallace.

Cast         
Eva Novak as Kate Westhanger
Agnes Emerson as Moya Flanbaugh
Lee Shumway as Michael Pretherson
William Marlon as George Flanbaugh
Lloyd Sedgwick as Ralph Sapson
Howard Davies as Colonel Westhanger 
George Chesebro as Tommy Carter
Frank Clark as The Bishop

References

External links

1920 films
1920s English-language films
Silent American drama films
1920 drama films
Universal Pictures films
Films directed by Stuart Paton
American silent feature films
American black-and-white films
1920s American films